Table tennis at the 2005 Islamic Solidarity Games was held in King Fahad Air Base Sport Hall, Ta'if from April 9 to April 16, 2005.

Medalists

Medal table

References
Singles
Doubles
Team

2005 Islamic Solidarity Games
2005 Islamic Solidarity Games
Islamic Solidarity Games
2005 Islamic Solidarity Games